Moga Bunda Disayang Allah ( May Ma Be Blessed By Allah) is a 2013 Indonesian family drama film directed by Jose Poernomo. It stars Fedi Nuril, Shandy Aulia, Alya Rohali, Donny Damara, Chantika Zahra, and Iang Darmawan. Based upon Tere Liye's novel of the same name, it tells the story of Karang, a man traumatized by an accident involving children who became the "psychologist" of a neurologically deformed child. The film was released on August 2, 2013 to mixed reviews by critics, who commented on the inconsistent plot.

Plot 
Karang, a Muslim man, is well known among the locals for creating a learning and social space for children. One day, he takes the children on a cruise, which fails to face a thunderstorm-induced wave and sinks. Karang, disturbed by the children's agony, escapes by jumping off. Unable to save the children, he experiences intense survivor guilt. Her relationship with a woman named Kinarsih intensifies, and they break up due to the severe effects survivor guilt brings upon him.

Karang leaves the city for a private villa of the HK family at a remote town. He is tasked to treat Melati, a neurologically deformed girl unable to speak, interpret sounds, learn, and interact normally due to being severe head trauma. Karang shouts on her ear when she is unable to follow commands, aggressing her in any conceivable way when she still does not. Mr. MK deems Karang ineffective, and Karang repeatedly leaves and re-enters the job, unsure yet willing to cure Melati. Exposed as an alcoholic, Mr. MK permanently bans Karang shortly before flying to Frankfurt for his business as an airline CEO. Mrs. MK secretly gives Karang a chance after Melati seen to be able to eat with cutlery, and through teamwork and assuming good faith in each other does Melati show more progress. Upon return, Mr. MK sees Karang to his shock, but compliments him the next day after Melati is able to speak when a word is written in her hand.

The family and Karang later go on a holiday at an island, wherein they rejoice at night. On the ride home, a car confuses the bus driver, clinging it at the edge of a bridge. Karang does a weight distribution initiative, but the bus flips and falls into the river. Everyone survives, although Melati faints. In a paper, Karang opined that this time, everyone survives because of his belief that Allah will not test His children beyond their limitations.

20 years later, Karang is a businessman, married to Kinarsih, and has three children. Melati graduates college and can now live normally, although she must use the Indonesian Sign Language. In her commencement speech, he thanks his elderly mother.

Background and release 
Moga Bunda Disayang Allah is an adaptation of Tere Liye's novel of the same name. It is inspired by Helen Keller, whose senses became disabled at the age of 19. Hellen was then taught by Anne Sullivan until she is able to sense again. The music in the film is composed by Melly Goeslaw.

It was released theatrically on August 8, 2013. In 2020, along with many Indonesian films, it was added to Disney+ Hotstar.

Reception and accolade 
Kompasiana praised the actors for their lively performance, but called out its confusing setting, and called the fact that Karang is able to buy so many wines irrational.

The film won the Citra Awards as film with the best visual effects in 2013.

References

External links 

 
 Moga Bunda Disayang Allah on Disney+ Hotstar

2013 drama films
2013 films
2010s teen drama films
2010s coming-of-age drama films
2010s children's drama films
Films about disability
Films about deaf people
Films about blind people
Indonesian teen drama films
Indonesian coming-of-age drama films
Indonesian children's films
Films scored by Melly Goeslaw